Austin Buckley (born 1960) is an Irish hurler who played as a left wing-forward for the Tipperary senior team.

Buckley joined the team during the 1982 championship and was a member of the team until his inter-county retirement almost a decade later. An All-Ireland medalist in the under-21 grade, he won two Munster winners' medals as a non-playing substitute in the senior grade.

At club level Buter is a one-time county club championship medalist with Cappawhite.

References

1960 births
Living people
Cappawhite hurlers
Tipperary inter-county hurlers